S Tupi (S-30)  is the lead boat of the  of the Brazilian Navy.

Construction and career
The boat was built at Howaldtswerke-Deutsche Werft in Germany and was launched on 28 April 1987 and commissioned on 6 May 1989.

Gallery

References

External links

Ships built in Germany
Tupi-class submarines
1987 ships